Ophiomorus kardesi is a species of skink, a lizard in the family Scincidae. The species is from Turkey.

References

Ophiomorus
Reptiles described in 2018